Vanished History: The Holocaust in Czech and Slovak Historical Culture is a 2014 book by Czech academic Tomas Sniegon of Lund University, Sweden, which addresses the memory and commemoration of the Holocaust in the Czech Republic and Slovakia.

References

2014 non-fiction books
History books about the Holocaust
Books about Czechoslovakia
Berghahn Books books